Meade Felix Griffin (March 17, 1894 – June 3, 1974) was a justice of the Supreme Court of Texas from April 1, 1949 to December 31, 1968.

References

Justices of the Texas Supreme Court
1894 births
1974 deaths
20th-century American judges